Peter Cregan (13 May 1918 – 12 August 2004) was an Irish hurler who played as a goalkeeper for the Limerick senior team.

Born in Croom, County Limerick, Cregan first appeared on the inter-county scene at the age of sixteen with the Limerick minor team. He made his senior debut during the 1937 championship. Cregan immediately became a regular member of the starting fifteen and won one All-Ireland medals, one Munster medal and one National Hurling League medal.

As a member of the Munster inter-provincial team on a number of occasions, Cregan won four Railway Cup medals. At club level he was twice a championship medallist with Croom.

Cregan retired before to the start of the 1947 championship.

References

1918 births
2004 deaths
Croom hurlers
Limerick inter-county hurlers
Munster inter-provincial hurlers
All-Ireland Senior Hurling Championship winners